Ollivier is a surname. Notable people with the surname include:

 Albert Ollivier (1915–1964), historian, writer, journalist, and politician
 Arthur Ollivier (1851–1897), New Zealand cricketer and mountaineer
 Charles-Prosper Ollivier d'Angers (1796–1845), French pathologist and clinician
 Clémence Ollivier (born 1984), French rugby union player
 Démosthène Ollivier (1799–1884), French Republican politician
 Émile Ollivier (1825–1913), French politician and prime minister
 Émile Ollivier (writer) (1940–2002), Québécois writer
 Éric Ollivier (1926–2015), French writer 
 Jean-Yves Ollivier (born 1944), French businessman and diplomat
 John Ollivier (1811–1893), 19th century Member of Parliament in Christchurch, New Zealand
 Jonathan Ollivier (1977–2015), British danseur
 Keith Ollivier (1880–1951), New Zealand cricketer 
 Louis-François Ollivier (1770–1820), French Navy officer
 Paul Ollivier (1876–1948), French actor
 Pierre Ollivier (born 1890), Belgian wrestler
 Valère Ollivier (1921–1958), Belgian road cyclist

See also
Jacques Cazotte aka Ollivier
Mount Ollivier, New Zealand

Breton-language surnames